Eye of GNOME is the official and default image viewer for the GNOME desktop environment, where it is also known as Image Viewer. There is also another official image viewer for GNOME called gThumb that has more advanced features like image organizing and image editing functions.

Eye of GNOME provides basic effects for improved viewing, such as zooming, full-screen, rotation, and transparent image background control. It also has many official plug-ins to extend its features or change its behavior.

File formats
Eye of GNOME supports the following file formats:

 ANI – Animation
 AVIF AV1 Image File Format
 BMP – Windows Bitmap
 GIF – Graphics Interchange Format
 ICO – Windows Icon
 JPEG – Joint Photographic Experts Group
 PCX – PC Paintbrush
 PNG – Portable Network Graphics
 PNM – Portable Anymap from the PPM Toolkit
 RAS – Sun Raster
 SVG – Scalable Vector Graphics
 TGA – Truevision Targa
 TIFF – Tagged Image File Format
 WBMP – Wireless Application Protocol Bitmap Format
 Webp
 XBM – X BitMap
 XPM – X PixMap

Eye of GNOME also supports viewing Exif/XMP metadata associated with an image.

Limitations
Eye of GNOME does not support DirectDraw Surface (.dds) or JPEG 2000

See also

 Comparison of image viewers
 gThumb – another image viewer for GNOME with organizing and image editing functions

References

External links

 

Applications using D-Bus
Free image viewers
GNOME Core Applications
Graphics software that uses GTK
Linux image viewers
Software that uses Meson